Arkady Ivanovich Morkov (– ) was a Russian Imperial diplomat, noble (count), and Active Privy Councillor of Russia.

Morkov was the member of the Russian Collegium for Foreign Affairs and Alexander Bezborodko aide. He later replaced Bezborodko. He served as the ambassador to the Netherlands (1781–83), Sweden (1785–86) and France (1801–03). In this last capacity, he signed the Treaty of Paris that formally ended Russian involvement in the War of the Second Coalition.

References
biography
biography

1747 births
1827 deaths
Ambassadors of the Russian Empire to France
Ambassadors of Russia to Sweden
Ambassadors of the Russian Empire to the Netherlands
Burials at Lazarevskoe Cemetery (Saint Petersburg)
Imperial Moscow University alumni